Norton is a hamlet on the outskirts of Yarmouth in the Isle of Wight, England. Its population is included in the count of the town of Yarmouth. It is situated in the West of the island and has a coast on the Solent.

Transport 
The A3054 road runs through the hamlet on its way towards Norton Green to the south and to Newport to east.

In the nearby Yarmouth, the Vehicle Ferry departs from Yarmouth Pier and goes to Lymington on the mainland.

The hamlet is served by the 7, A, Island Coaster and Needles Breezer buses which go to Newport, Alum Bay and Totland (Route 7), Yarmouth (Needles Breezer), Ryde (Island Coaster) and Freshwater Bay (Route A).

References 

Hamlets on the Isle of Wight